Anomalías eléctricas  is a 2010 Equatoguinean short animated comedy.

Synopsis
The main character is studying in his house in Malabo when, suddenly, the power is cut. He tries to look for a candle, but he falls down because of the darkness. The light comes back and he can start to study again, but this does not last long. The power goes off again, the character tries to fix it, but he has an electric accident. When the light comes back on, he appears with "Rasta" hair and, a few seconds later, the power is cut for the third time.

External links

Full movie on YouTube

2010 animated films
2010 films
Equatoguinean short films
2010s French-language films
2010s animated short films
2010 short films